Clive Berrangè van Ryneveld (19 March 1928 – 29 January 2018) was a South African cricketer who played in 19 Test matches between 1951 and 1958. He was the son of Reginald Clive Berrangè van Ryneveld (b. 7 July 1891, d. 1969) and Maria Alfreda Blanckenberg (b.1900, d.1994).  Before his death in 2018, he was the oldest living South African cricket captain.

Van Ryneveld was also an international rugby union player. He represented Oxford University RFC in The Varsity Match in 1947, 1948 and 1949 and won four caps as a centre for the England national rugby union team, playing in all four matches of the 1949 Five Nations Championship. He scored three tries for England; one against  and two against . He never represented  at rugby union.

According to an obituary by Sport24 he "was one of South Africa’s greatest all-round sportsmen who represented and captained South Africa at cricket and represented England at rugby during his time as a Rhodes Scholar at Oxford University (where his older brother Anthony was also a Rhodes Scholar), but he will be remembered equally for the role he played in trying to create a just society for all in South Africa".

EW Swanton, the journalist and broadcaster, described him as “just about the best centre three quarter of my time in English football . . . he had speed, balance, jink and body swerve, lovely hands, a remarkably cool brain; and though comparatively light was indomitable in defence.”

Van Ryneveld had a brief career in South African politics. In 1957 he was elected to Parliament as a member of the United Party, then the main opposition to the governing National Party which had introduced apartheid to South Africa.  Two years later, in 1959, Van Ryneveld and eleven other MPs broke from the United Party to form the Progressive Party, which adopted a much more aggressive opposition to apartheid. The party's platform was ahead of its time, and in the 1961 general election all of the Progressive MPs except one, Helen Suzman, lost their seats.  

Thereafter Van Ryneveld practised law. In his last years he lived in Cape Town with his wife, Verity Anne Hunter (b.25 September 1931). Their three children, Mark, Philip and Tessa, live in South Africa. 

He published 20th Century All-rounder: Reminiscences and Reflections of Clive van Ryneveld in 2011.

Death
Van Ryneveld died at the age of 89 on 29 January 2018.

References

External links 
 Clive van Ryneveld reflects on his career
 Clive van Ryneveld at ESPN Cricinfo
 Clive van Ryneveld at ESPN Scrum

1928 births
2018 deaths
Cricketers from Cape Town
Alumni of Diocesan College, Cape Town
Alumni of University College, Oxford
South Africa Test cricketers
South African cricketers
South Africa Test cricket captains
Western Province cricketers
Oxford University cricketers
English rugby union players
England international rugby union players
Rugby union centres
Rugby union players from Cape Town
Oxford University RFC players
Gentlemen cricketers
North v South cricketers